Mertensia ciliata is a species of flowering plant in the borage family known by the common names tall fringed bluebells, mountain bluebells, and streamside bluebells.

Distribution
It is native to the western United States, in California, Nevada, Utah, and Oregon. It often grows in moist habitat, such as subalpine meadows and creeksides. It often carpets large areas of meadow and hillside with blue-green foliage and sweet-scented bluebell blooms.

Description
Mertensia ciliata is a perennial herb producing a cluster of erect stems from a thick, branching caudex. The leafy stems reach well over a meter in maximum height. The veiny leaves are oval to lance-shaped and pointed.

The inflorescence is an open array of many clustered blue bell-shaped flowers each between 1 and 2 centimeters long. The hanging, fragrant flower is tubular, expanding into a wider, lobed mouth. As the individual flowers progress in age they change in color from blue to pink-red.

The flowers bear poricidal anthers and are fertilized via buzz-pollination by several Bombus species. Primary Nectar robbing by Bombus species, including Bombus occidentalis is common in some populations.

Uses 
The flowers, young stems and leaves are edible raw; older leaves (when the plant tends to be hairy) should be cooked. The plant contains alkaloids so should not be eaten in high quantities.

References

External links
Jepson Manual Treatment
CalPhotos

ciliata
Edible plants
Flora of California
Flora of Nevada
Flora of Oregon
Flora of Utah
Flora of the Sierra Nevada (United States)
Flora of the Great Basin
Flora without expected TNC conservation status